John Caird may refer to:

 John Caird (director) (born 1948), British stage director
 John Caird (theologian) (1820–1898), Scottish theologian

See also
Caird (surname)